The Macedonian lion is an unofficial symbol of North Macedonia. After the independence of the Republic of Macedonia from Yugoslavia, the lion was proposed as a coat of arms of the new independent state several times.

Background

From the end of the 16th till the end of the 18th centuries, the region of North Macedonia was commonly represented in foreign armorials with a coat of arms depicting a golden lion on red field, or red lion on golden field. The earliest known example of this is the Fojnica Armorial from 16/17 century, and later examples include the  Korenić-Neorić armorial of 1595, a 1620 armorial on display in the Belgrade Museum of Contemporary Art, and a 17th-century armorial in Berlin Library. The Korenić-Neorić armory roll of 1595 included a five-pointed crown. The Belgrade Museum of Contemporary Art displays a 1620 version of the symbol with a three-pointed crown, while the Berlin Library displays a 17th-century version with the five-pointed crown. The use of the lion to represent Macedonia was continued in foreign heraldic collections throughout the 16th to 18th centuries

During the late 19th century the Internal Macedonian-Adrianople Revolutionary Organization arose, which aim was the autonomy for Macedonia and Adrianople regions. The organization modeled itself after the earlier Bulgarian revolutionary traditions and adopted their symbols as the lion, motto, etc. It was disbanded in 1934 by the Bulgarian army after a military coup. Several Macedonian parties have claimed after 1990 a line descent from the old IMARO.

Proposed introduction
The Republic of Macedonia had no heraldic emblem when the country gained independence from Yugoslavia,  but since then this emblem has often been proposed as a replacement for the non-heraldic national emblem of the republic, a remnant of socialistic symbolism. Such efforts have so far failed, due to political and national disputes over possible replacements. A proposal by architect and graphic designer Miroslav Grčev was put forward in 1992 to replace it with a revised version of the historical gold lion on a red shield. However, this was rejected on three main grounds:
 several political parties, notably VMRO-DPMNE, already use that emblem as their party symbols
 the Albanian political parties of Macedonia considered the proposal to be only representative for the ethnic Macedonians, but not also for ethnic Albanians
 the state coat of arms of Bulgaria is somewhat similar (but not identical)

Because of these reasons, the political parties agreed to continue to use the current device until a solution is found. The emblem did not appear on the country's first passports, however, in 2007 the device was put on the front and the inside of the new biometric Macedonian passports, while the parliamentary debate about acceptance of a new national emblem still continues.

According to the provisions of the Article 5, Section 2 of the Constitution of Macedonia, the two-thirds majority is required to pass a law on the new symbols of the Republic. The usage of the Coat of arms has been defined by a law.

In 2009 Internal Macedonian Revolutionary Organization–People's Party proposed the golden lion on red background as a new coat of arms of Macedonia, based on the traditional logo of the historical VMRO, but it was not accepted. On the 5 December 2014 the VMRO-DPMNE government of the Republic of Macedonia, in accordance with the then policy of Antiquization, proposed a coat of arms which would replace the old national emblem. According to the Macedonian Heraldry Society, the new coat of arms is based on an illustration from Jerome de Bara (1581). The illustration from de Bara's book "Le blason des armoiries" depicts attributed arms of Alexander the Great. It is blazoned as "Or, a lion gules" (on a golden background, a red lion) and topped with a golden mural crown to represent the republican form of government. The parliament did not vote on this design.

Present usage
The coat of arms with a golden lion on a red shield is used to represent several Macedonian political parties, including the largest one; Internal Macedonian Revolutionary Organization – Democratic Party for Macedonian National Unity and Internal Macedonian Revolutionary Organization–People's Party. At the same time, the lion as a symbol of these parties is inherited from the original organization VMRO, where it was borrowed from the Bulgarian coat of arms.

Gallery

Alternatives

See also

National emblem of the Republic of Macedonia

References

External links

Macedonia
National symbols of North Macedonia
Macedonia